Coded anti-piracy (CAP) is an anti-copyright infringement technology which marks each film print of a motion picture with a distinguishing pattern of dots, used as a forensic identifier to identify the source of illegal copies.

They are not to be confused with cue marks, which are black or white circles usually in the upper right-hand corner of the frame. A cue mark is used to signal the projectionist that a particular reel of a film is ending, as most films come to theaters on several reels of celluloid.

CAP code

CAP coding is a multi-dot pattern that is printed in several frames of a film print of a theatrically exhibited motion picture. It is sometimes accompanied by text code printed on the edge of a motion picture print, outside the visible picture area.

The dots are arranged in a unique pattern as identification of the particular print of a movie, and are added during manufacture. The marks are not present on the original film negative; they are produced either by physical imprint on the final film print or by digitally postprocessing a digitally distributed film. This enables codes to be customized on a per-copy basis so that they can be used to trace the print to the theaters that played that particular print and to trace any bootleg copies however they were made be they telecined, cammed, or telesynced.

Kodak's CAP

The original style of CAP code, developed in 1982 by Eastman Kodak along with the Motion Picture Association of America, is a series of very small dots printed in the picture area of a film print.

The original instance of CAP developed by Kodak is a technology for watermarking film prints to trace copies of a print, whether legal or not.

Deluxe's CAP

A newer and more common variation has been developed by Deluxe Laboratories. It makes use of more visible dots, and was developed to thwart film copying from theatergoers with camcorders, or prints that have been illicitly telecined to videotape or DVD.

Deluxe's version has been given the pejorative name of "crap code" by filmgoers. The term "crap code" was coined on a movie projectionists' discussion forum, due to its quite intrusive nature when viewing. These dots are usually placed on bright areas of a film frame, so they can be more easily identified, and are a reddish-brown color.

CineFence

A different marking system is CineFence, introduced by Philips in 2006 and commercially available in 2008.

The Digital Cinema System Specification by Digital Cinema Initiatives mandates forensic marking of digital film; CineFence is the first marking system that complies with this standard.

CineFence claims to be imperceptible to the viewer, but robust to copying and encoding, and encodes 35 bits/5 minutes.

See also
 Canary trap
 Cam (bootleg)
 Copy protection
 Cue mark
 EURion constellation
 Printer steganography

Notes

References

 Philips: CineFence
 CineFence brief specifications
 Technicolor Inc./Warner Brothers Patent: Motion picture anti-piracy coding

Film and video technology
Watermarking
Copyright infringement